Italexit, whose complete name is Italexit for Italy, is a Eurosceptic political party in Italy, which advocates the country's exit from the eurozone and the European Union. Its founder and current leader is Gianluigi Paragone, senator and former TV journalist, who has defined himself as a "conservative", and presented Italexit as a "conservative party".
da
Paragone opposes Italy's membership in the NATO alliance.

History
In January 2020, Five Star Movement (M5S) senator and former journalist Gianluigi Paragone, known for his Eurosceptic stance, was expelled from the party after he abstained in the vote of confidence for the government, which was supported by M5S and the Democratic Party, and had also voted against the 2022 budget. In the following months, Paragone was speaking about a new party, talking about the "need for courage...and money."

In July 2020, a few weeks after meeting with Nigel Farage, a key figure of the Brexit movement, Paragone launched Italexit with the stated goal of taking Italy out of the European Union.

Two M5S senators, Carlo Martelli and Mario Giarrusso, defected to Italexit in 2021, while, in 2022, League senator William De Vecchis and deputy Jessica Costanzo, who had been already expelled from the M5S, also joined.

Between 2021 and 2022, the party was critical towards the policies of Mario Draghi's national unity government applied to contain the COVID-19 pandemic in Italy. Italexit strongly opposed the EU Digital COVID Certificate, also known as "Green Pass", which, from October 2021 onwards, became mandatory to work and travel in the country. Paragone labelled the vaccination certificate an "obligation of infamy," stated that he was not vaccinated, and described his opposition to mandatory vaccination as a "religious war".

In the 2021 Milan municipal election, Paragone obtained 2.99% of the vote and came in third behind incumbent mayor Giuseppe Sala of the centre-left coalition and Luca Bernardo of the centre-right coalition. Because he did not surpass the 3 per cent electoral threshold he did not get elected to the municipal council. Elsewhere, in the 2021 local elections, Italexit's candidates scored from 0.8% of the vote in Turin, to 2.0% in Bologna.

In the 2022 Italian local elections, Italexit scored from 0.9% of the vote in Como to 2.6% in Alessandria.

In June 2022, Italexit held in Rome its first congress, at the end of which, on the 26th, its organizational chart and political platform were approved, while Gianluigi Paragone was unanimously elected party secretary.

On 31 July, Paragone announced the formation of a joint list of candidates for the 2022 Italian general election with Alternativa, a party supportive of dirigisme and economic interventionism, established in November 2021 by former Five Star Movement members. After five days, on 5 August 2022, Alternativa announced the dissolution of the electoral alliance with Italexit, on the grounds that neofascists were ostensibly present within Italexit's lists of candidates. Paragone responded by accusing Alternativa of attempting to "use [Italexit] as a taxi to the Parliament."

Paragone has stated that he wants Italy to exit from the NATO alliance, as well as to cease sanctions against Russia, sanctions which, he declared, "are causing damage to [the country's] economy."

Ideology 

As declared in the program for 2022 Italian general election, the party proposes a return of Italian sovereignty (especially fiscal and monetary) in contrast to the influence of European Union, with the orientation being strongly eurosceptic and critical of part of the same Italian political and bureaucratic establishment. In this sense, it suggests policies such as the nationalisation of the Bank of Italy and other strategic assets (energy, roads, communications and water) and a social public expenditure.

Regarding COVID-19, Italexit is against social limitations and EU Digital COVID Certificate, and proposes public compensations for victims of adverse effects of COVID-19 vaccines and a public inquiry about the Italian management of COVID-19 pandemic.

Italexit welcomed some dissidents from the neo-fascist social movement CasaPound in 2022, leading several members to resign amid accusations that the party had fallen to the far-right of the political spectrum. According to la Repubblica, Fanpage.it and Rolling Stone, the party fell under the control of far-right militants and was used by CasaPound to enter the parliament.

Electoral results

Italian Parliament

See also
 Brexit Party
 European debt crisis
 List of political parties in Italy
 Withdrawal from the European Union
 Withdrawal from the eurozone
 Withdrawal from NATO

Notes

References

Further reading

External links 
Official website

2020 establishments in Italy
Eurosceptic parties in Italy
Single-issue parties in Italy
Political parties established in 2020
Five Star Movement breakaway groups
Withdrawal from the European Union
Opposition to NATO
Far-right politics in Italy